Ab Nik may refer to:
Ab Nik, Izeh, Khuzestan Province (اب نيك)
Ab Nik, Lali, Khuzestan Province (اب نيك)
Ab Nik, Tehran (ابنيك)